Kulin Brahmins are the Bengali Brahmins belonging to Hindu religion. They trace their ancestry to five families of Kannauj who migrated to Bengal.

History
In the 11th century AD, after the decline of the Pala dynasty, a Hindu king, Adi Sura brought in five Brahmins and their five attendants from Kanauj, his purpose being to provide education for the Brahmins already in the area whom he thought to be ignorant, and revive traditional orthodox Brahminical Hinduism. These Vedic Brahmins were supposed to have nine gunas (favoured attributes), among which was insistence on same rank marriages. Multiple accounts of this legend exist, and historians generally consider this to be nothing more than myth or folklore lacking historical authenticity. The tradition continues by saying that these incomers settled and each became the founder of a clan. 

The five Brahmin clans, which later became known as Mukherjees, Chatterjees, Banerjees, Gangulys and Bhattacharjees, were each designated as Kulina ("superior") in order to differentiate them from the more established local Brahmins.

See also
Kulin Kayastha

References

Further reading

Brahmin communities of West Bengal